The 2022 Oklahoma City mayoral election took place on February 8, 2022, to elect the Mayor of Oklahoma City. Oklahoma City mayoral elections require a majority vote and in order to win the first round a candidate must reach 50% of the vote.
Incumbent mayor David Holt won re-election to his second term in office with nearly 60% of the first round vote.

General election

Candidates

Declared
Carol Hefner, businesswoman and candidate for Oklahoma Senate district 47 in 2011
David Holt, incumbent mayor
Jimmy Lawson, Director of Permitting at the Oklahoma Workers' Compensation Commission and finance professor at Rose State College
Frank Urbanic, defense attorney, U.S. Air Force veteran, and former member of the Oklahoma County Republican Executive Committee

Withdrew
Jason Padgett, businessman and former actor

Endorsements

Debates
A mayoral candidate debate was scheduled for January 25, 2022 by media organizations NonDoc, News 9, and other nonpartisan partners. All candidates were invited to the debate and 3 participated:  Jimmy Lawson, Frank Urbanic and Carol Hefner. Incumbent David Holt declined to participate, being represented by a photograph and empty podium on stage.

Polling

Results

Results by county

Notes

Partisan clients

References

Oklahoma City
Oklahoma City
2022